Puthukkudiyiruppu (Sinhala: පුදුකුඩිඉරුප්පු) is a small town in the Mullaitivu District of Sri Lanka.

There are four main roads which lead to Mullaithivu in the east, Paranthan towards the west, Iranaipalai towards the north and Oddusuddan towards the south.

Most of the villagers are farmers and there is a significant proportion that fish.

In the 1990s there was a massive influx of people from Jaffna District. The small two ward government dispensary became one of the main hospitals in Mullitivu district.

History
Until it was declared as a separate DRO (Divisional Revenue Division), it was under Mullaithivu. Subsequently, when it was declared as a separate DRO division Mr Amirthalingam became the first DRO. Later it became the Divisional Secretary division with the administrative reforms.

Being mainly a farming community, the structure of houses were unique until about 1960s. The houses usually consisted of four blocks. There was a main lounge with half walls, a closed block with one door which was used as the bedroom, a kitchen and a store house for paddy.

The town was mostly destroyed during fighting between government troops and LTTE in 2009.

Schools
 Sri Subramanya Vidyalayam ( Earlier it was known as "Church of Ceylon Tamil Mixed School")
 Puthukkudiyiruppu Central college ( Earlier it was known as "Puthukkudiyiruppu Mahavidyalayam")
 Roman Catholic School
 Vikneswara Vidyalayam

Temples
 Sri Kandhaswami Temple
 Ulagalanth Vinaayagar Temple
 Sivanagar Sivan Temple
 Sri Muthumaariyamman Temple
 Kaaddamanakku Vinayagar Temple
 Sri Thurkai amman Temple
 Arasadi pillayaar Temple
 Mahavishnu Temple

Towns in Mullaitivu District
Puthukkudiyiruppu DS Division